Stockman Run is a tributary of the Beaver River in western Pennsylvania.  The stream rises in north-central Beaver County and flows generally east entering the Beaver River at Koppel, Pennsylvania. The watershed is roughly 16% agricultural, 70% forested and the rest is other uses.

References

Rivers of Pennsylvania
Tributaries of the Beaver River
Rivers of Beaver County, Pennsylvania